The Men's keirin event of the 2009 UCI Track Cycling World Championships was held on 26 March 2009.

Results

Round 1

Round 1 repechage

Round 2

Finals

Gold medal race

Race for 7th-12th place

References

External links
 Full results at tissottiming.com

Men's keirin
UCI Track Cycling World Championships – Men's keirin